Duarte Pinto de Carvalho de Freitas do Amaral, GCIH, ComC KCSG;  (13 May 1909 – 16 July 1979) was a Portuguese politician.

Background
He was the fourth of six children of Duarte do Amaral Pinto de Freitas and wife Ana Mendes Ribeiro de Oliveira, and the brother of Gaspar Pinto de Carvalho de Freitas do Amaral.

Career
He was a Licentiate in Civil Engineering from the University of Porto.

A landowner, he became the Lord by purchase of the House of an Aveleira, in Pencelo, Guimarães.

He became a Deputy to the National Assembly of Portugal and a Voter of the Superior Councils of the Industry and the Combustibles, Vice President of the Administration Council of Sacor and President of the Administration Councils of Cidla and Petroquímica.

Distinctions
  : Grand Cross of the Order of Prince Henry
 : Commander of the Order of Christ
 : Knight Commander of the Order of St. Gregory the Great
 : Knight of the Order of the Holy Sepulchre
 : Knight
  : Grand Officer of the Order of Rio Branco
  : Officer of the Order of the Southern Cross
 : Honorary Citizen of Póvoa de Varzim

Marriage and issue
He married at the Chapel of the Patriarchate in Lisbon on 12 December 1936 Maria Filomena de Campos Trocado, born in Póvoa de Varzim on 8 July 1913, sister of his sister in law, daughter of Dr. Josué Francisco Trocado and wife Maria Alves de Campos, and had four children: 
 Duarte Pinto de Freitas do Amaral (Guimarães, 29 October 1937 - 6 August 1941)
 Pedro Pinto de Freitas do Amaral (14 October 1938 - House of an Eira, 7 October 1941)
 Diogo Pinto de Freitas do Amaral
 João Pinto de Freitas do Amaral

References

 Anuário da Nobreza de Portugal, III, 2006, Tomo IV, pg. 862 to 873
 Costados, Gonçalo de Mesquita da Silveira de Vasconcelos e Sousa, Livraria Esquina, 1.ª Edição, Porto, 1997, N.º 55

1909 births
1979 deaths
People from Guimarães
Legislators in Portugal
Grand Crosses of the Order of Prince Henry
Commanders of the Order of Christ (Portugal)
Knights Commander with Star of the Order of St. Gregory the Great
Knights of Malta
Knights of the Holy Sepulchre
University of Porto alumni
Freitas do Amaral family